Jan Remie (2 March 1924 – 26 June 1950) was a Dutch boxer. He competed in the men's lightweight event at the 1948 Summer Olympics. At the 1948 Summer Olympics, he lost to Ron Cooper of Great Britain.

References

External links
 

1924 births
1950 deaths
Dutch male boxers
Olympic boxers of the Netherlands
Boxers at the 1948 Summer Olympics
Sportspeople from North Brabant
Lightweight boxers